Seo Yu-na (Hangul: 서유나; born December 30, 1992), better known by the mononym Yuna, is a South Korean singer, actress and yoga instructor. She is a former  member of the South Korean girl group AOA and its sub-groups, AOA Black and  AOA Cream.

Early life
Seo Yu-na was born on December 30, 1992. She began playing the piano when she was seven years old, causing her to take interest in becoming a singer as an adult. At the age of 18, she traveled to Seoul alone after getting consent from her parents. She transferred schools and stayed at her uncle's house while she went to auditions and practised singing. Her younger sister Yu-ri made her debut in 2014 with girl group Berry Good under Asia Bridge Entertainment, adopting the stage name "Seoyul".

Career

Career with AOA
On July 30, 2012, Yuna made her debut as a member of AOA on Mnet's M! Countdown with their debut single album, Angels' Story and the title track "Elvis". AOA has released three EPs and nine singles as of June 22, 2015. She is part of AOA's subunit "AOA Black". In 2015, AOA traveled to Hainan where they filmed One Fine Day, a variety program in which idols/idol groups go on a "healing" vacation. They were the seventh idol group to appear on the program(followed by Girl's Day)

Yuna is also part of sub-unit AOA Cream together with Shin Hye-jeong and Kim Chanmi. The sub-unit released their first teaser on February 1, 2016.
The music video teaser for title track I'm Jelly Baby was released on February 4, 2016.
AOA Cream released their title track together with the MV on February 12, 2016.

On January 1, 2021, Yuna's contract expired with FNC Entertainment, and she left the company.

As actress
Yuna has also had a successful, yet lesser known acting career, as she has played a lead role in the Japanese Musical "Summer Snow" in 2013, as well as playing another lead role in the comedic Korean web-drama "Prince's Prince" in February 2015.

On October 20, 2013, Yuna sang for the OST "I'm Ok" for KBS's TV series Marry Him If You Dare. The song "I'm OK" is the theme song for the main character Na Mi-rae.

In October 2016 it was announced that she will be part of the cast of a new web-drama Hot and Sweet playing Joon Young, a part-time food worker. The drama will premiere on October 20 and run for 8 episodes. Yuna also released 2 songs for the drama, one "Hot and Sweet" a duet with Choi Min-hwan and "Everything" a solo song.

In 2016, Yuna has also been cast in another new web-drama 'My Old Friend'. The drama will be aired starting in mid November for 5 episodes through Naver TVCast.

In 2017, Yuna was cast in the romantic comedy series Single Wife, scheduled for August 23. In June 2017, she sang the theme song for drama My Only Love Song, the song is called "Another You".

Yuna sung the OST for tvN's A Korean Odyssey together with Shin Ji-min, the song is called "If You Were Me" and it was released on January 28, 2018.

In 2019 Yuna together with Shin Hye-jeong and Kim Chanmi will take part in Lifetime's reality program AOA DaSaDanang Heart Attack Danang where the members will travel to Danang, Vietnam for an adventure. In July 2019, Yuna was cast in web drama Love Formula 11M as So-jin.

As Yoga instructor
After her departure from AOA, Yuna gave an update on her social media and revealed she had transformed into a yoga instructor and living a new life outside of the entertainment industry.

As songwriter, producer and backing singer 
In December 2019, FNC Entertainment confirms that Yuna used her pseudonym E.NA to become a backing singer for Shin Yu-na's parts for Itzy's debut single "Dalla Dalla"; she also had credits in single "Heart Shaker" by Twice.
She is also credited as the backing singer for Cosmic Girls's single "Butterfly".

Discography

Soundtrack appearances and solo performances

Filmography

TV series

Musical theatre

References

External links

 

	

Living people
People from Busan
Actresses from Busan
Musicians from Busan
1992 births
AOA (group) members
FNC Entertainment artists
K-pop singers
South Korean female idols
South Korean women pop singers
Japanese-language singers of South Korea
Mandarin-language singers of South Korea
South Korean female models
South Korean television personalities
South Korean dance musicians
South Korean musical theatre actresses
21st-century South Korean actresses